Warrior wasp may refer to:

 Synoeca, a genus of wasps found in South and Central America
 Megalara garuda, a species of wasp found in Indonesia

Animal common name disambiguation pages